Niege Dias (born 5 December 1966) is a former professional tennis player from Brazil. She also competed for the Brazil Fed Cup team from 1985 to 1988.

In her career, she won two WTA Tour singles tournaments, the 1987 Brazil Open and 1988 Barcelona Open.

Her best singles result at a Grand Slam tournament was reaching the third round of the 1988 French Open.

Dias retired from professional tennis in 1989, at the age of 22. She married her former coach, Luiz Carlos Enck.

WTA Career finals

Singles: 2 (2 titles)

Doubles: 2 (1 title, 1 runner-up)

Notes

References

External links
 
 
 

1966 births
Living people
Brazilian female tennis players
Sportspeople from Rio Grande do Sul
21st-century Brazilian women
20th-century Brazilian women